King's Lynn and West Norfolk District Council in Norfolk, England is elected every four years. Since the last boundary changes in 2003, 62 councillors have been elected from 42 wards.

Political control
Since the first elections to the council in 1973 political control of the council has been held by the following parties:

Leadership
The leaders of the council since 2007 have been:

Council elections
1973 West Norfolk District Council election
1976 West Norfolk District Council election
1979 West Norfolk District Council election
1983 King's Lynn and West Norfolk Borough Council election (New ward boundaries)
1987 King's Lynn and West Norfolk Borough Council election
1991 King's Lynn and West Norfolk Borough Council election (Borough boundary changes took place but the number of seats remained the same)
1995 King's Lynn and West Norfolk Borough Council election
1999 King's Lynn and West Norfolk Borough Council election
2003 King's Lynn and West Norfolk Borough Council election (New ward boundaries increased the number of seats by 2)
2007 King's Lynn and West Norfolk Borough Council election
2011 King's Lynn and West Norfolk Borough Council election
2015 King's Lynn and West Norfolk Borough Council election (Some new ward boundaries)
2019 King's Lynn and West Norfolk Borough Council election

By-election results

1995-1999

1999-2003

2003-2007

2007-2011

2011 - 2015

2015 - present

References

By-election results

External links
 King's Lynn and West Norfolk Council

 
Council elections in Norfolk
District council elections in England